The London Palladium is a Grade II* West End theatre located on Argyll Street, London, in Soho. The auditorium holds 2,286 people. Hundreds of stars  have played there, many with televised performances. Between 1955 and 1969 Sunday Night at the London Palladium was staged at the venue, produced for the ITV network. The show included a performance by The Beatles on 13 October 1963. One national paper's headlines in the following days coined the term "Beatlemania" to describe the increasingly hysterical interest in the band.

While the theatre hosts resident shows, it is also a famous for one-off performances, such as concerts, TV specials and Christmas pantomimes. It has hosted the Royal Variety Performance 43 times, most recently in 2019. In March 2020, the venue closed due to the COVID-19 pandemic's effect on the theatre industry, but reopened over four months later on 1 August 2020.

Architecture
Walter Gibbons, an early moving-pictures manager, built the Palladium in 1910 to compete with Sir Edward Moss's London Hippodrome and Sir Oswald Stoll's London Coliseum. The facade (on the site of Argyll House, demolished in the 1860s, from which the pub opposite took the name The Argyll Arms), dates back to the 19th century. Formerly it was a temporary wooden building called Corinthian Bazaar, which featured an aviary and aimed to attract customers from the recently closed Pantheon Bazaar (now the site of Marks & Spencers) in Oxford Street. The theatre was rebuilt a year later by Fredrick Hengler, the son of a tightrope walker, as a circus arena for entertainments that included promenade concerts, pantomimes and an aquatic display in a flooded ring. It then became the National Skating Palace – a skating rink with real ice. However, the rink failed and the Palladium was redesigned by Frank Matcham, a famous theatrical architect who also designed the Coliseum, on the site that had previously housed Hengler's Circus.

The theatre retains many of its original features and was Grade II* listed in September 1960. The building now carries Heritage Foundation commemorative plaques honouring Lew Grade and Frankie Vaughan.

The Palladium had its own telephone system so the occupants of boxes could call one another. It also had a revolving stage.

History

1910 to 1928
The theatre started out as The Palladium, a premier venue for variety performances. Pantomimes were also featured there. In 1926, the pantomime starred Lennie Dean as Cinderella, footage of which remains to this day. The theatre is especially linked to the Royal Variety Performances, where many were, and still are, held. In 1928, for three months the Palladium also ran as a cinema. Following this 'Cine-Variety' episode the theatre fell dark for a short period in the autumn of 1928.

The George Black era
From 3 September 1928, the Palladium reopened under the directorship of the impresario/producer George Black as part of the General Theatre Corporation (GTC). When Black took control the theatre was close to bankruptcy. He revived its fortunes by returning to the original ethos of the Palladium by staging large variety shows, with a capital 'V' – and as well as headlining Britain's homegrown acts he brought over big American stars such as Duke Ellington and his Orchestra (on 12 June 1933, his first ever concert hall performance), Adelaide Hall, Louis Armstrong and Ethel Waters for two-week engagements. Before too long, under Black's management the Palladium was soon gaining praise again as 'The World's Leading Variety Theatre'. In 1935, Black initiated the Crazy Gang revues at the Palladium (for which he is chiefly remembered) with Life Begins at Oxford Circus. The revues continued at the Palladium as an annual event until they transferred to the Victoria Palace theatre in 1940. Black managed the Palladium until his death in 1945.

The climax of the 1935 Alfred Hitchcock spy thriller The 39 Steps was filmed at the Palladium.

Second World War
The theatre was hit by an unexploded German parachute mine on 11 May 1941. The device had fallen through the roof, becoming lodged over the stage. A Royal Navy bomb disposal team was sent to deal with it. After the mine was located, the fuse locking ring had to be turned to allow access to the fuse itself. Rather disconcertingly, the fuse began ticking as soon as it was touched. This caused a rapid evacuation of the immediate area, but the mine did not detonate. The two team members cautiously returned, extracted the fuse and removed other hazardous components, rendering the mine 'safe'. It was then lowered to the stage and disposed of. The George Medal for gallantry and undaunted devotion to duty was given to Sub Lieutenant Graham Maurice Wright for his action in the Palladium on that night. He was later killed, on 19 August 1941, while en route for Gibraltar on board the torpedoed troopship .

The Val Parnell era
Val Parnell took over as managing director after George Black's death in 1945. He adopted a controversial, but very successful, policy of presenting high-priced, big-name American acts at the top of the bill. Among many, the list included Carmen Miranda, Judy Garland, Sophie Tucker, Bing Crosby, Danny Kaye, Rosemary Clooney, Channing Pollock, the Andrews Sisters with Vic Schoen and his orchestra, Bob Hope, Liza Minnelli, Lena Horne, Ella Fitzgerald, Peggy Lee, Frank Sinatra, Sammy Davis Jr., Frankie Laine and Johnnie Ray, freezing out many British stars of the day, who were relegated to second-billing.

From 1955 to 1967, the theatre was the setting for the top-rated ITV Network variety show Sunday Night at the London Palladium hosted first by Tommy Trinder, followed by Bruce Forsyth, Norman Vaughan, and Jimmy Tarbuck. The programme was broadcast live every week by ATV, which was owned by the famous theatrical impresario Lew Grade. Production was by Val Parnell. Six programmes aired as special episodes in the United States between May and August 1966 on NBC. British stars on the show included Cliff Richard and the Shadows, Petula Clark, the Beatles and the Rolling Stones. The Beatles' publicist Tony Barrow said that after the band's first appearance on the show on 13 October 1963, Beatlemania took off in the UK. Their performance was watched by 15 million viewers. One national paper's headlines in the following days coined the term "Beatlemania" to describe the phenomenal and increasingly hysterical interest in the Beatles – and it stuck.

Parnell became associated with a property development company and began to sell Moss Empires' theatres for redevelopment. When it became known in 1966 that this fate awaited the London Palladium, The Victoria Palace and even the Theatre Royal, Drury Lane, Prince Littler organised a take-over to save the theatres and Val Parnell retired to live in France. The new managing director of Stoll-Moss was Louis Benjamin, who took on the role while continuing as MD of Pye Records within the ATV Group.

By 1965, the Wine Society was operating out of a cellar under the Palladium. Additionally, it was also using one at Joiner Street under London Bridge Station and one at St James's Bond in Rotherhithe (which flooded at high tide). In 1968, Sammy Davis Jr. starred in Golden Boy, the first book musical to be produced in the venue. A Johnny Cash album was recorded there in 1968, but Columbia Records never released it. Bootlegs of the performance are in circulation. Jose Feliciano also recorded a hit USA gold status double LP for RCA records called "Alive Alive O!" in April 1969

Post-Parnell
 On 6 December 1970 Dorothy Squires gave a concert at the Palladium, recorded for an LP release the following year.

In January 1973, glam rock band Slade played a gig in the theatre which resulted in the venue's balcony nearly collapsing. 

In July 1974, singer Cass Elliott performed for two weeks. 48 hours after her final performance she died in her sleep in her rented flat in Mayfair. Also in 1974, Josephine Baker performed in the Royal Variety Performance. The 1991 film The Josephine Baker Story implied that, like Cass Elliott, she died after a show there, but this is not true. She actually died in Paris four days after a show there.

Bing Crosby performed for two weeks at the Palladium starting on 21 June 1976. The resulting live album Bing Crosby Live at the London Palladium reached No. 9 in the UK album charts in November 1977.

In October 1976, Marvin Gaye recorded a live concert at the venue. The performance documented on the resulting double LP, entitled Live at the London Palladium and released in 1977. 

In 1981, the cellars of the Palladium housed a waxworks museum, aptly called "The Palladium Cellars", headlined by a Yul Bryner live projection automaton, as the cowboy Gunslinger from Westworld.

In the late 1980s, the Palladium was once again the setting for the popular ITV1 variety show, Live From the Palladium, compered by Jimmy Tarbuck. During this time, the theatre was under the ownership of the Stoll Moss Theatres Group, and the management of Margaret and David Locke, who were both major shareholders of Stoll Moss at the time.

In 1988, the Edinburgh Gang Show appeared as part of the British Musical Hall Society's Silver Jubilee.

In 1991, a new production of the Tim Rice and Andrew Lloyd Webber musical Joseph and the Amazing Technicolor Dreamcoat opened starring Jason Donovan in the title role with Linzi Hateley as the Narrator. Phillip Schofield later replaced Donovan in the title role.

In 1994, Cameron Mackintosh produced a new revival of Lionel Bart's musical Oliver!, directed by Sam Mendes. It starred Jonathan Pryce as Fagin and Sally Dexter as Nancy.

In 1998, Arlene Phillips directed and choreographed a stage musical adaptation of Saturday Night Fever starring Adam Garcia and Ben Richards.

The 21st Century & the Really Useful Group 

In 2000, ownership of the theatre changed once again when Stoll Moss was acquired by Andrew Lloyd Webber's Really Useful Group. From 3 May 2000 to 5 January 2002, the Palladium played The King and I starring Elaine Paige and Jason Scott Lee. This production was a West End transfer of the hugely successful 1996 Broadway production. Before the opening, the box office had already taken in excess of £7 million in ticket sales. This version of the show was a lavish affair, with new dialogue and music added, while the original material was updated. During the run, Josie Lawrence played the role of Anna and Paul Nakauchi and Keo Woolford played the role of the King, respectively. After the production closed, the famous (but outdated) revolving stage was removed to make way for more modern technology.

From April 2002 to 4 September 2005, the Palladium played host to a theatrical version of Chitty Chitty Bang Bang with songscore by the Sherman Brothers as a successor to The King & I. Throughout its three and a half year run at the venue, the production starred many celebrities (see below). This show proved to be the most successful in the theatre's long history and reunited, 50 years later, the show's choreographer Gillian Lynne, with the theatre in which she had appeared as the Palladium's Star Dancer during the early 50s. On 1 November 2004 and 22 November singer-songwriter Jackson Browne performed two concerts during his solo acoustic tour.  For Christmas 2005–06, the venue staged Bill Kenwright's production of Scrooge – The Musical which closed on 14 January 2006. The show starred Tommy Steele, making a return to the Palladium. From February 2006, the theatre played host to a new musical production entitled Sinatra At The London Palladium, which featured a live band, large screen projections and dancers performing Frank Sinatra's greatest hits.

Lloyd Webber and David Ian's production of The Sound of Music opened at the Palladium in November 2006. The production ran for just over two years, before closing on 21 February 2009. It starred Connie Fisher and Summer Strallen as Maria, Simon Shepherd, Alexander Hanson and Simon MacCorkindale as Captain Von Trapp and Lesley Garrett and Margaret Preece as the Mother Abbess. A production of Sister Act the Musical opened on 2 June 2009, starring Patina Miller as Deloris, Sheila Hancock as Mother Superior, Ian Lavender as Monsignor Howard, Chris Jarman as Shank, Ako Mitchell as Eddie, Katie Rowley Jones as Sister Mary Robert, Claire Greenway as Sister Mary Patrick and Julia Sutton as Sister Mary Lazarus.

Rufus Wainwright held two sold out Judy Garland tribute concerts at the theatre on 18 and 25 February 2007. On 20 May 2007 the London Palladium hosted the 2007 BAFTA awards, which were broadcast on BBC television, and in 2010 the BAFTA Television Awards returned to the Palladium. While the Theatre has a resident show, it is still able to have one-off performances; this is enabled by the scenery of the resident show being designed to be easily removed. For example, the set of Sister Act was able to be hoisted completely above the stage out of view in an area called the Fly Loft.

The London Palladium turned 100 years old on Boxing Day 2010, and a one-hour television special entitled '100 Years of the Palladium' aired on BBC Two on 31 December 2010. Sir Elton John performed at the venue in September 2013 in a special show where he was presented with the Brit Awards Icon, subsequently broadcast on ITV1. Robbie Williams promoted his new album Swings Both Ways, the UK's 1000th No. 1 album, with a one-night performance on 8 November 2013 that was filmed for television broadcast (BBC One). He was joined by members of the cast of The Muppet Show (Kermit the Frog, Miss Piggy, Fozzie Bear, Gonzo, Statler and Waldorf), Lily Allen, Rufus Wainwright, his father, a children's choir and a 30-piece orchestra. Invited guests included Adele and One Direction.

From 2011 to 2012, the Palladium became home to Andrew Lloyd Webber's new production of The Wizard of Oz which featured new songs by Lloyd Webber and Tim Rice and starred Michael Crawford, Danielle Hope, Hannah Waddingham, Russell Grant, Sophie Evans and Des O'Connor. This was followed by a return season of Scrooge: The Musical starring Tommy Steele. In 2013 it became home to a revival of A Chorus Line starring John Partridge, Scarlett Strallen and Leigh Zimmerman. 

Since 2013, excluding 2014, 2015 and 2016, Britain's Got Talent have held Judges' auditions at the Palladium as one part of their audition tour which usually lasts from mid-January to late-February.

In 2014, Really Useful Group split in two, and the entity owning the theatre became the Really Useful Theatres Group.

In 2018, Sir Bruce Forsyth's ashes were laid to rest under the Palladium's stage, with a blue plaque commemorating him on a nearby wall, featuring the description "Without question the UK's greatest entertainer, he rests in peace within the sound of music, laughter and dancing… exactly where he would want to be."

Between 26 June and 8 September 2019, the Palladium staged the 50th Anniversary production of Andrew Lloyd Webber's and Tim Rice’ Joseph and the Amazing Technicolor Dreamcoat. It was a whole new production with Sheridan Smith starring as the Narrator and Jason Donovan as the Pharaoh and introducing Jac Yarrow in the title role. In 2022, the Palladium served as the venue for the limited West End revival of Beauty and the Beast.

A new production of The Wizard of Oz will be revived at the Palladium for a limited season from 23 June to 3 September 2023.

Christmas pantomimes 

In December 2016, pantomime returned to the Palladium for the first time in nearly three decades with Cinderella produced by Qdos Entertainment and directed by Michael Harrison. It starred Julian Clary, Paul O'Grady, Amanda Holden, Paul Zerdin, Nigel Havers, Lee Mead, Count Arthur Strong and Natasha Barnes.

For the Christmas 2017 season, the pantomime returned with Dick Whittington starring Clary, Zerdin and Havers returning, joined by Elaine Paige, Gary Wilmot, Ashley Banjo & Diversity and Charlie Stemp. The production won the 2018 Laurence Olivier Award for Best Entertainment and Family.

For Christmas 2018, the pantomime returned with Snow White with Clary, Zerdin, Havers, Wilmot and Stemp returning joined by Dawn French, Danielle Hope and Vincent Simone and Flavia Cacace.

For Christmas 2019, the pantomime returned with Goldilocks and the Three Bears, with Clary, Zerdin, Havers and Wilmot returning, joined by Paul O'Grady, Matt Baker, Janine Duvitski, Sophie Isaacs and Lauren Stroud.

Due to the COVID-19 pandemic, in December 2020 the pantomime returned with Pantoland at the Palladium to a socially distanced audience. Clary, Zerdin, Havers and Wilmot returned and joined by Elaine Paige, Beverley Knight, Charlie Stemp, Jac Yarrow and Ashley Banjo & Diversity. The production opened 12 December, however due to the Government's tier 3 restrictions, the production closed on 15 December 2020.

The pantomime returned for Christmas 2021 to a full capacity with Pantoland at the Palladium with Clary, Zerdin, Havers, Wilmot and Yarrow returning alongside Donny Osmond and Sophie Isaacs.

In February 2022, it was announced that Dawn French along with Clary, Havers, Wilmot and Zerdin, would headline the newest Palladium Pantomime, Jack and the Beanstalk, with tickets on sale from March 2022. On 27 April 2022, it was announced that West End icon Alexandra Burke would join the cast. On 27 September 2022, the lineup was completed with West End stars Natalie McQueen, Rob Madge and Louis Gaunt. The show ran for six weeks, from 10 December 2022 to 15 January 2023.

In late January 2022, it was revealed that the 8th untitled pantomime would be announced sometime in Spring 2023.

Notable recent and present productions

 1991: Joseph and the Amazing Technicolor Dreamcoat – Steven Pimlott's reworking of the Andrew Lloyd Webber/Tim Rice musical, starring Jason Donovan and Linzi Hateley
 1994–98: Oliver! – Cameron Mackintosh's revival directed by Sam Mendes. Originally starring Jonathan Pryce, Sally Dexter and Miles Anderson.
 1998–2000: Saturday Night Fever directed and choreographed by Arlene Phillips, starring Adam Garcia and Ben Richards
 2000–02: The King and I directed by Christopher Renshaw. A transfer of the acclaimed 1996 Broadway revival, this version starred Elaine Paige and Jason Scott Lee

 2002–05: Chitty Chitty Bang Bang directed by Adrian Noble and choreographed by Gillian Lynne. The original cast included Michael Ball, Emma Williams, Anton Rodgers, Nichola McAuliffe, Brian Blessed and Richard O'Brien.
 2005: Scrooge – The Musical, by Leslie Bricusse, starring Tommy Steele
 2006–09: The Sound of Music directed by Jeremy Sams, produced by Andrew Lloyd Webber, starring BBC How Do You Solve a Problem Like Maria? winner Connie Fisher, Alexander Hanson, Lesley Garrett
 2009–10: Sister Act the Musical, starring Patina Miller, Sheila Hancock and Ian Lavender
 2011–12: The Wizard of Oz, directed by Jeremy Sams, produced by Andrew Lloyd Webber, starring BBC Over the Rainbow winner Danielle Hope and Michael Crawford
 2014–15: Cats starring Nicole Scherzinger and later Beverley Knight.
2016: Eugenius! by Ben Adams and Chris Wilkins, world premiere concert performance on 29 June. Produced by and starred Warwick Davis
2016–17: Cinderella, return of the Palladium pantomime, starring Paul O'Grady, Julian Clary, Amanda Holden, Nigel Havers, Paul Zerdin, Lee Mead and Count Arthur Strong

2017: The Wind in the Willows starring Rufus Hound, Simon Lipkin, Neil McDermott, Gary Wilmot and Denise Welch
2017–18: Dick Whittington, starring Julian Clary, Elaine Paige, Ashley Banjo & Diversity, Paul Zerdin, Nigel Havers, Gary Wilmot and Charlie Stemp
2018: The King and I directed by Bartlett Sher. A transfer of the 2015 Broadway revival starring Kelli O'Hara and Ken Watanabe
2018–19: Snow White, starring Dawn French, Julian Clary, Paul Zerdin, Gary Wilmot, Nigel Havers, Charlie Stemp, Vincent & Flavia and The Magnificent Seven.
2019: Joseph and the Amazing Technicolor Dreamcoat starring Sheridan Smith, Jac Yarrow and Jason Donovan.
19 October 2019: Cradle of Filth's 20th Anniversary, playing Cruelty and the Beast in its entirety.
29 October 2019: Opeth, In Cauda Venenum Tour
2019–20: Goldilocks and the Three Bears, starring Paul O'Grady, Julian Clary, Matt Baker, Paul Zerdin, Nigel Havers and Gary Wilmot.
2020 Jan/Feb: Madame X Tour Madonna.
2020: Pantoland at the Palladium*, starring Julian Clary, Elaine Paige, Paul Zerdin, Nigel Havers, Gary Wilmot, Ashley Banjo & Diversity, Charlie Stemp, Beverley Knight and Jac Yarrow.
 *This production is a COVID-friendly performance, as the venue introduced new safety measures earlier in the year. The production was disrupted on 16 December 2020, as the theatre cancelled the rest of the pantomime season due to a third lockdown because of the new Covid variant.
2021: Joseph and the Amazing Technicolor Dreamcoat revival of summer 2019 production starring Alexandra Burke, Jason Donovan and Jac Yarrow (with Linzi Hateley at certain performances).
2021–22: Pantoland at the Palladium, starring Donny Osmond, Julian Clary, Paul Zerdin, Nigel Havers, Gary Wilmot, Jac Yarrow, Sophie Isaacs and The Tiller Girls
2021: "An Audience with… Adele" was filmed at the Palladium as part of her comeback for her new album 30.
2022: Beauty and the Beast, part of the UK tour starring Martin Ball, Gavin Lee, and Sam Bailey.
2022–23: Jack and the Beanstalk, starring Dawn French, Julian Clary, Alexandra Burke, Paul Zerdin, Nigel Havers, Gary Wilmot, Natalie McQueen, Rob Madge and Louis Gaunt
2023: The Wizard of Oz, directed by Nikolai Foster, with new songs by Tim Rice and Andrew Lloyd Webber
2023: Tailenders: The Live Show, starring Greg James, Felix White, King of the Sea - Mattchin Tendulkar  and James Anderson (cricketer)

Notes

References

 Guide to British Theatres 1750–1950, John Earl and Michael Sell pp. 122–3 (Theatres Trust, 2000)

External links 

 The Official London Palladium Site
 History of the London Palladium from Television Heaven's Sunday Night at the London Palladium
 The Palladium Pantomimes It's Behind You
 Building history, Survey of London, vols 31 and 32 (1963)
 London Palladium Theatre History with many pictures and original Programmes; Music Hall and Theatre History Site – Dedicated to Arthur Lloyd, 1839 – 1904
 Moss Empires' Theatres in the Fifties by Donald Auty, Music Hall and Theatre History Site – Dedicated to Arthur Lloyd, 1839 – 1904

West End theatres
Grade II* listed buildings in the City of Westminster
Theatres completed in 1910
Theatres in the City of Westminster
Edwardian architecture in London
1910 establishments in England